Villas and palaces in Milan are used to indicate public and private buildings in Milan of particular artistic and architectural value. Milan has always been an important centre with regard to the construction of historical villas and palaces, ranging  from the Romanesque to the neo-Gothic, from Baroque to Rococo.

History 

The spread of the construction of patrician villas in Milan has early origins. Archaeological excavations have revealed a complex system of villas from the first imperial age, going back to about the 1st century BCE.

After the fall of the Barbarians and the end of the Middle Ages, a new tradition of aristocratic refinement, chivalry and good taste was established in Milan by the ruling Visconti and Sforza families. Throughout the 15th and 16th centuries the local nobility built luxurious residences to demonstrate their power and influence. Today only a few examples of these can still be seen, such as the ducal apartments of the Castello Sforzesco and other private villas such as Casa Borromeo and Casa Pallavicini. Not only Lombard but also Venetian, Ligurian, Piedmontese and Tuscan artists contributed to their design and decoration, the latter especially in the creation of frescoes.

The subsequent Spanish domination somewhat curbed the carefree enthusiasm of the humanist era, tending to favour the development of private architecture and making way for it by demolishing existing buildings.

The 18th century above all was marked by the construction in Milan of so-called "villas of delight" (ville di delizia). As the concept of the summer residence spread, villas were built there for nobles from Rome, Venice, Turin, Bologna and Naples who conducted their business in Milan.

With the industrial revolution came a new period of growth and an enhancement of the architectural beauty of the city, brought about during the 19th century by the influence of the Habsburgs, who sought to endow Milan with a new visual dimension since at this stage it was the second city of the empire after Vienna.

The 20th century was the last period of the "villas of delight". When it entered the new Kingdom of Italy Milan had become an industrial centre of major importance to the new economy and in particular one of the key points for exchanges with Europe. The bourgeoisie then settled in the city as the new 'aristocrats' of the second industrial revolution, seeking to return Milan to the grandeur of the past.

Despite the extraordinary architectural heritage of the city, what can be seen today represents only a small part of what was created throughout the entire history of the city: the traditional tendency to build after having demolished already existing palaces, together with bombings from the second world war, greatly reduces the heritage of the city.

A list of palaces

Roman
 The Emperor's Palace

13th century
 Casa Panigarola (Piazza Mercanti)
 Palazzo della Ragione or the Broletto nuovo (Piazza Mercanti)

14th century

 Loggia degli Osii

15th century
 Casa Atellani (Corso Magenta)
 Casa Fontana Silvestri (Corso Venezia)
 Casa Parravicini (Via Cino del Duca)
 Cascina (della) Boscaiola or Cascina Boscarola
 Palazzo Acerbi
 Palazzo Carmagnola
 Palazzo Castani (Piazza San Sepolcro), seat of the Questura di Milano
 Palazzo Castelli-Borromeo (Piazza Borromeo)
 Palazzo Isimbardi
 Palazzo Pozzobonelli-Isimbardi
 Villa Mirabello (Via Villa Mirabello, 6), also known as the "Cascina Mirabello"

16th century

 Palazzo di Brera (Via Brera)
 Palazzo dei Giureconsulti (Piazza Mercanti)
 Palazzo Marino, (Piazza della Scala)
 Palazzo Recalcati
 Palazzo delle Scuole Palatine
 Palazzo Stampa di Soncino, Casati
 Palazzo Taverna (Via Bigli)
 Villa Simonetta (Via Stilicone)

17th century

 Casa Buttafava 
 Casa Crespi (Corso Venezia)
 Casa degli Omenoni (Via degli Omenoni) 
 Casa Toscanini 
 Palazzo Annoni (Corso di Porta Romana, 6)
 Palazzo Arcivescovile
 Palazzo del Capitano di Giustizia (Corso Europa)
 Palazzo Cusani (Via Brera, 15)
 Palazzo Dugnani (Via Manin, 2)
 Palazzo Durini-Caproni or "Palazzo Durini" (Via Durini)
 Palazzo Erba Odescalchi
 Palazzo Litta or Palazzo Arese (Corso Magenta, 24)
 Palazzo Olivazzi (Via Bigli)
 Palazzo Orsini (Via Borgonuovo)
 Palazzo Pusterla Brivio 
 Palazzo delle ex Scuole Arcimbolde  
 Palazzo del Senato (Via Senato)
 Palazzo Sormani (Corso di Porta Vittoria, 6), seat of the Biblioteca Comunale di Milano
 Palazzo delle Stelline 
 Palazzo Toscanini (Via Durini)

18th century
 Casa Berchet 
 Casa Buzzoni 
 Casa Monti (Via G. Verdi)
 Palazzo Belgiojoso d'Este (Piazza Belgiojoso)
 Palazzo Beccaria
 Palazzo Citterio 
 Palazzo Clerici
 Palazzo Confalonieri
 Palazzo Fagnani
 Palazzo Gallarati-Scotti
 Palazzo Greppi
 Palazzo Litta-Cusani (Corso Europa)
 Palazzo Mellerio
 Palazzo Morando-Attendolo-Bolognini (Via S. Andrea, 6)
 Palazzo Moriggia (Via Borgonuovo, 23), today the Museum of the Risorgimento
 Palazzo Reale
 Palazzo Serbelloni (Corso Venezia)
 Palazzo Sormani Andreani
 Palazzo Taverna, via Montenapoleone

 Palazzo Toscanini
 Palazzo Trivulzio
 Palazzo Visconti di Grazzano

19th century
 Ca de' Facc (Piazza Baiamonti, 3)
 Ca' de Sass (sede della Banca Cariplo)
 Casa Dell'Acqua
 Casa Alesina (Via Cappuccio, 11)
 Casa Bettoni or dei Bersaglieri (Corso di Porta Romana, 20)
 Casa Borella (Via Berchet 2, junction Via San Raffaele and Via U. Foscolo)
 Casa Bosi Pelitti (Via Castelfidardo, 10)
 Casa Bottelli (Via Dante, 12)
 Casa Broggi 
 Ca' Brutta
 Casa Candiani (Via G.B. Vico, 20)
 Casa Castini (Via Dante 4, corner Via S. Prospero)
 Casa Celesia (Via Dante, 7)
 Casa Chicchieri (Via Dante, corner Via San Tommaso)
 Casa Ciani (Corso Venezia, corner Via Boschetti)
 Casa Dell'Acqua (Piazza Castello 27)
 Casa Fasoli (Via Torino, 50)
 Casa Gadda-Portaluppi (Piazza Castello 20, corner Via Lanza 5)
 Casa Grondona (Corso Italia 57, corner Via San Martino)
 Casa Manzoni (Via Morone 1 / Piazza Belgiojoso)
 Casa Negri (Corso di Porta Romana)
 Casa Pirovano (Via Giulini 2, corner with Via Dante)
 Casa and Museo Poldi-Pezzoli (Via Manzoni 12-14)
 Casa Reininghaus
 Casa Rigamonti (Via Solferino, 24-24a)
 Casa Rossi (Corso Magenta, 12)
 Casa Sardi (Via Paleocapa, 3)
 Casa Sartorelli (Via San Raffaele, 4)
 Palazzo Anguissola (Via Manzoni)
 Palazzo Archinto 
 Palazzo & Museum Bagatti-Valsecchi (Via Santo Spirito 7)
 Palazzo della Banca d'Italia
 Palazzo Barozzi 
 Palazzo Belgiojoso-Besana (Piazza Belgiojoso)
 Palazzo Beltrami 
 Palazzo Bonacosa (Via Q. Sella 4 / Piazza Castello)
 Palazzo Borgazzi 
 Palazzo Brentani (Via Manzoni, 6)
 Palazzo Cagnola
 Palazzo Carcano-Tondani 
 Palazzo Diotti also known as "Palazzo della prefettura"
 Palazzo Ercole Turati (Via Meravigli, 11)
 Palazzo Francesco Turati (Via Meravigli, 7-9)
 Palazzo Haas (Via U. Foscolo, 1-3)
 Palazzo dell'ex Kursaal Diana 
 Palazzo Luraschi (Corso Buenos Aires 1 / Piazza Oberdan)
 Melzi d'Eril
 Palazzo del Museo di Scienze Naturali (Corso Venezia, 55)
 Palazzo della Permanente (Via Turati, 34)
 Palazzo Porro-Lambertenghi (Via Monte di Pietà)
 Palazzo Rusconi-Clerici (Piazza Castello, 16)
 Palazzo Saporiti
 Palazzo Savonelli (Via Dante, piazza Cordusio, Via Broletto, Via S. Prospero 1)
 Palazzo Serbelloni
 Palazzo Spinola
 Palazzo della Società per le Strade Ferrate del Mediterraneo  
 Palazzo Talenti (Via G. Verdi)
 Palazzo Tarsis (Via S. Paolo)
 Palazzo Taverna
 Palazzo Torelli-Viollier (Via Paleocapa 4-6, corner Via Jacini)
 Palazzo della Veneranda Fabbrica del Duomo 
 Villa Belgiojoso-Bonaparte or Royal Villa of Milan

20th century
 Ca' Brutta 
 Casa Apostolo 
 Casa Caccia Dominioni 
 Casa Campanini 
 Casa Cambiaghi 
 Casa Ferrario
 Casa Galimberti 
 Casa Guazzoni 
 Casa Laugier 
 Casa Morganti 
 Casa Piana (Via Sant'Ambrogio 29, corner with Via Lanzone)
 Castello Cova 
 Palazzo Berri-Meregalli 
 Palazzo Bolchini 
 Palazzo Castiglioni (Corso Venezia) 
 Palazzo Civita 
 Palazzo Crespi 
 Palazzo Cusini 
 Palazzo di Giustizia
 Palazzo del cinema Odeon
 Palazzo del Toro
 Palazzo del Touring Club Italiano
 Palazzo dell'Arte
 Palazzo della Banca Commerciale Italiana
 Palazzo della Banca d'Italia
 Palazzo della Banca di Roma
 Palazzo della Banca Popolare di Milano
 Palazzo della ex Borsa 
 Palazzo della Rinascente 
 Palazzo della Società Reale Mutua di Assicurazioni
 Palazzo d'Este (viale Beatrice d'Este 23)
 Palazzo Fidia 
 Palazzo Meroni 
 Palazzo Mezzanotte, seat of the Borsa d'Italia
 Palazzo Veronesi 
 Torre Rasini 
 Torre San Babila 
 Torre Velasca 
 Villa Necchi Campiglio
 Villino Calabresi (Via XX Settembre)
 VIllino Gotico (Via Cernaia)
 Villino Hoepli (Via XX Settembre)

Sources
 I palazzi della vecchia Milano G.C. Bascapé, Ulrico Hoepli Editore, Milano, 1986
 Milano di terracotta e mattoni O.P. Melano, Mazzotta Editore, Milano, 2002

Buildings and structures in Milan
Tourist attractions in Milan
Palaces in Milan